The 2019–20 Southside Flyers season is the 28th season for the franchise in the Women's National Basketball League (WNBL). 2019–20 will be their first season as the Southside Flyers, concluding 27 seasons as the Dandenong Rangers.

Roster

Standings

Results

Pre-season

Regular season

Finals

Semi-finals

Grand Final

Awards

In-season

Post-season

Club Awards

References

External links
Southside Flyers Official website

2019–20 WNBL season
WNBL seasons by team
2019–20 in Australian basketball
Basketball,Southside Flyers
Basketball,